Karitsa  is a lowland Aromanian (Vlach) town of the former Municipality of Dio, which is part of the municipality of Dio-Olympos, in the Pieria regional unit, Central Macedonia, Greece.  The population was 2,025 people as of 2011. It is located 13 km south of Katerini.

Livestock farming and tobacco growing are the main occupations of the residents. Also produced is corn, beet, endive, kiwi, and cereals.

References

Notes
Ο Πολιτιστικός Σύλλογος Κορίτσας

Populated places in Pieria (regional unit)
Aromanian settlements in Greece